Thomas Price (born 22 January 1993) is an English rugby union player who plays for Scarlets as a second row. He was an England under-20 international playing a part in England's winning 2013 IRB Junior World Championship team.

After playing junior rugby with Stratford-upon-Avon RFC, Price began his professional career with Leicester Tigers before joining Scarlets in 2015.

On 24 March 2019, Price returned to the Premiership Rugby with Exeter Chiefs from the 2019-20 season. On 13 July 2021, Price rejoined Welsh region Scarlets in the United Rugby Championship from the 2021-22 season.

References

External links 
ESPN Player Profile

1993 births
Living people
English rugby union players
Exeter Chiefs players
Leicester Tigers players
Rugby union players from Leamington Spa
Scarlets players
Rugby union locks
Nottingham R.F.C. players